Sofia Valeryevna Nadyrshina (born 14 May 2003) is a Russian snowboarder. She is a world champion and a threefold junior world champion. On 9 January 2021, she won her first FIS World Cup title in Parallel Giant Slalom in Scuol.

At the 2021 World Championships, Nadyrshina won two medals: silver in Parallel Giant Slalom and gold in Parallel Slalom. At the age of 17, she became the youngest World Champion in the latter discipline.

World cup podiums

Individual podiums
  3 wins – (1 PS, 2 PGS)
  7 podiums – (2 PS, 5 PGS)

Team podiums
  1 podium – (1 PSLM )

References

External links

2003 births
Living people
Russian female snowboarders
People from Yuzhno-Sakhalinsk
Snowboarders at the 2022 Winter Olympics
Olympic snowboarders of Russia
Sportspeople from Sakhalin Oblast